Cork Mid (or Mid Cork) may refer to one of two parliamentary constituencies in County Cork, in the South of Ireland

 Mid Cork (UK Parliament constituency), a single-seat constituency used for the election to the United Kingdom Parliament in 1918, but whose MP took his seat instead as TD in the first Dáil Éireann
 Cork Mid (Dáil constituency), a 4-seat (later 5-seat) constituency represented in Dáil Éireann 1961–1981